This is a list of the Lebanon national football team results from 1934 to the present day that, for various reasons, are not accorded the status of official International A Matches.

Results

1930s

1940s

1950s

1960s

1970s

1980s

1990s

2000s

2010s

Bibliography

External links
 Lebanon fixtures on RSSSF.com
 Lebanon International Results (Early History) on RSSSF
 International matches on RSSSF.com
 Beirut XI & AUB on Al-Kulliyah Review
 Beirut XI & AUB on Al-Kulliyah
 Lebanon fixtures on eloratings.net

unofficial
Lebanon